Schizolaena viscosa is a tree in the family Sarcolaenaceae. It is endemic to Madagascar.

Description
Its densely hairy filaments are unique in the genus.

Distribution and habitat
Schizolaena viscosa is known only from the northern region of Diana. Its habitat is dry forest from sea-level to  altitude.

References

viscosa
Endemic flora of Madagascar
Trees of Madagascar
Plants described in 1919